Bernard Mizeki College is an independent boarding school for boys situated in Marondera, Zimbabwe approximately 87 km east of the capital Harare and or 13.5 km north east of Marondera town. It was founded in memory of Bernard Mizeki, an African martyr who died in the Marondera area. The school was established by leading private individuals of the Anglican Church in the then Rhodesia through a deed of trust drafted in 1958 and registered on 29 May 1959 at Harare. The college was established predominantly for African boys however over the years there were girls who attended the college.

Foundation
The school was founded by a group of prominent individuals of both European and African races and both sexes to be a leading high school for African boys though it had been set up with the view of it becoming a multiracial international school.,

The founders had seen the winds of change sweeping across Africa and felt they had to provide high quality education, equivalent to what Europeans were receiving, for the future leaders of an independent Rhodesia. The whole idea behind the school was to bring up well-rounded African leaders in areas of finance, industry, business, education, medicine, law, military and politics. Rt. Reverend Cecil Alderson, like his predecessor Bishop Edward Paget,  realised the need for a senior college for Africans had become increasingly urgent, and within a few weeks of his translation from the Bloemfontein Diocese, Bishop Alderson began to investigate ways of meeting it. At the same time Canon Robert Grinham had been working to see the existence of schools for Africans whose facilities equaled or approximated to those of Ruzawi, Springvale and Peterhouse. To this end he devoted his energies after his retirement from Springvale.

The Rt Rev Cecil Alderson, then Bishop of Mashonaland and Canon Robert Grinham, raised one hundred British pounds with which they formed the Bernard Mizeki Schools Trust which was then mandated to establish schools. The trust deed was prepared at Honey and Blackenberg and registered in 1959 while another trust with the same name was registered in the United Kingdom in July 1962 under trust number 313889. A pledge of forty thousand pounds was then made to Bishop Alderson at the Lambeth Conference in London so that the project could be realized. A significant chunk of that money is believed to have come from the Beit Trust and then anonymous individuals well wishers banks and corporates.

It was intended to be a multiracial, elite boys' school, an 'African Eton', and was strongly supported by the Anglican Church and a number of Federation businesses. With the
support of the Governor General of The Federation of Rhodesia funding in the early days was not a challenge

Architectural designs and a master plan of the school were done by John Vigour in 1959. The actual construction of the college started in 1960 with the arrival Bruce Berrington, together with some artisans who had built Peterhouse. The school was sited amidst brachystegia woodland, a bird-watcher's paradise, and among the baboon and dassie inhabited granite bouldered kopjes that are so typical of Zimbabwe at what is known as the Bovey Tracey Estate. This had been the site of St Bernards School since 1891.

The school was intended to appeal to the upper African class and charged fees three to four times higher than ordinary mission schools. The first head to be appointed, Peter Holmes Canham a civil servant, came from British West Africa (Ghana). Canham was described as a passionate and charismatic figure eccentric with a fiery, if short-lived, temper. Canham arrived in September 1960 to take up the headship of the college. Upon the commencement of the construction of the College Canon David Neaum left St Bernards Mission for Chikwaka Mission protesting against the construction of the school due to what he considered as the importation of elitism into an Africa crying out for universal education, especially of girls, was iniquitous.

By the time Father Andrew Hunt retired the enrolment had risen to 320 boys, he relocated to Mutare and became board chair for St Davids Bonda in Mutare. Due to the liberation war at that time the expansion of Bernard Mizeki College stalled for a number of years the Ministry was no longer providing funds for the schools expansion. After Father Hunt left, the Rev. Leslie Davies was appointed to the post of Headmaster of Bernard Mizeki College. Unfortunately his term of office did not last long because of the murders of surrounding farmers and a number of priests and nuns at the nearby St. Pauls Musami. After the incident at Musami, the Rev. L. Davies was advised by the local police to leave the school as they could not guarantee his safety and that of the students. The board of governors immediately appointed Mr. Chiadzwa to take over as headmaster of the college avoiding having to completely shutdown the school as other schools like Eagle School in Manicaland which closed in 1976

Governance
Bernard Mizeki College is run through the Bernard Mizeki Schools Trust which was founded in 1959 by Canon Robert Grinham and Rt Rev Cecil Alderson.

Peter Canham, made Bernard Mizeki College such an exceptionally good school. As a private school, it was his task, along with the governors, to raise the money to build, staff and ensure the future of the school. An ex-colonial civil servant, he ran the place with superb efficiency, leaving the teachers free to get on with their jobs. He had strong views on what an 'education' was. In the days when 'blacks' (the other racial groups were 'whites' and 'coloureds') were only allowed into one of Salisbury, the capital's large hotels, he took the prefects to the Ambassador's and made them sit down to a full evening meal - so they could learn the etiquette of 'public' eating.

At the time of founding, there were several committees put in place to ensure the establishment of the college was a success. At the very top there were the Patrons of the college the three patrons were The Governor-General of Southern Rhodesia The Rt. Honourable Earl of Dalhousie, The Governor of Southern Rhodesia Sir Humphrey Gibbs and Sir Ellis Robins.

the College Trustees was made up of leading lawyers, business persons, and senior civil servants. one of the trustees was Robert stumbles of Stumbles and Row Law Firm.

The Board of Governors consisted of notable business person lawyers and civil servants like Herbert W. Chitepo, Robert Tredgold. In order to ensure standards at Bernard Mizeki College closely approximated those at Peterhouse the founders made sure that whoever is or was Rector of Peterhouse permanently sat on the executive committee of the Bernard Mizeki College board of governors. This arrangement still stands today.

Association of Trust Schools
On 19 October 1962 Bernard Mizeki College became a founding member of the Association of Trust Schools (ATS) represented by Mr G.C.V. Coppen at the inaugural meeting which also saw the formation of the Conference of Independent Schools Heads (CHISZ). As of July 2016 the college is not a member of the CHISZ ATS, however negotiations are underway to rejoin. The college is currently a member of the International Boys' Schools Coalition (IBSC).

The College and the Primary School

The college was under the headmastership of Peter Holmes Canham, whilst the Bernard Mizeki Primary School was under the headmastership of Mr. G.F. Coney. Canham headed Bernard Mizeki College for 4 years and was succeeded by Reverend R. Glazebrook. The two schools (the college for secondary education, the school for primary) were under the same Board of Governors. The schools were heavily aided by the Ministry of African Education of Southern Rhodesia Government. Planned expansion was slowed down for a time by the lack of financial Support, but by 1963 the number of pupils reached 180 in the college and 140 in the school. Boys who had passed through primary school would automatically qualify to attend the college. Under the headmastership of Mr. P. Nheweyembwa the college has embarked on a number of developmental projects thus the college was awarded the Secretary's Bell Merit Award for Best School in Mashonaland East for 2014.

Mr Peter H. Canham being a seasoned civil servant from the Gold Coast now Ghana, his career as an administrator in the Gold Coast began in the late 1930s and concluded with the colony's independence as Ghana in 1957. Upon attaining Independence of the Gold Coast Peter Holmes Canham moved to Southern Rhodesia where he took headmastership of Bernard Mizeki College. His most notable influence on the college was how he introduced systems of good governance amongst students. He introduced a Students Senate where the prefect's body was elected officials from the hostels they resided. Elections and campaigns were held every year to select new senators. This led to the college producing an unusually high number of business leaders, lawyers, and politicians. According to one former staff member "It was because of my experiences at the school that I later went into teaching but I never again came across such an inspirational headteacher. Later, it was the lack of true leadership skills which made so many of the schools at which I taught for almost 30 years such disappointing places." Due to the same architect and artisans who had built Peterhouse being contracted in the construction of Bernard Mizeki College a few of the buildings between the two schools began to look a lot similar. This resulted in a heated argument between F.R. Snell, first rector of Peterhouse and Peter Canham. F. R. Snell accused Peter Canham of copying building Plans of Peterhouse. In 1964 Peter Canham Left Bernard Mizeki College after some disagreements with the Board of Governors and went on to head schools in Uganda, took up principalships of teacher training colleges in Western and Northern Nigeria, and finally to teaching Third World Studies in the Institutes of Education at the Universities of London and Cardiff. He retired from Cardiff in June 1981, but his retirement was soon clouded by ill-health, and he died in October 1984.

Motto and school badge

The school badge was designed by a Mr Watambwa who was one of the artisans involved in the construction of the college in 1960. The badge depicts a shield with a cross on it with two spears running down across at slanted angle. A martyr's crown sits atop the cross. The college's motto is printed on a ribbon below the shield.

Academic
The college aims to provide an academic curriculum that provides pupils with a broad-based educational experience. Introduction of more specialised subjects has taken place in the last few years the options available enable pupils to take a combination of academic or commercial or practical subjects. In the 2014 academic year Bernard Mizeki College was ranked 53rd nationally and 7th in Mashonaland East Province attaining a pass rate of 96.97% with a candidature of 33 boys for Advanced Level studies. In the same year the college attained an 86.11% pass rate with 71 boys having sat for the ZIMSEC Ordinary Level examinations and was ranked 29th nationally. These results sparked an outcry among parents and the former students who demanded the school to improve its performance in public examinations.

Recent Challenges
In November 2015 the cabinet adopted a civil services report which recommended the withdrawal of funding for teacher salaries employed at private schools due to the current Economic meltdown in Zimbabwe. The government grant was used to pay salaries for seventeen teachers stationed at Bernard Mizeki College. The government argued that teachers at private schools alone gobbled about $70 million United States dollars in salaries and allowances. This move has forced the college to engage parents on how best to reach an agreement on this issue. The agreements have to be presented to the ministry of education. The affected teachers last received their salaries from government Salaries Services Bureau in July 2016

Notable alumni

Jameson Timba - Member of Parliament for Mount Pleasant
Chirikure Chirikure

See also

List of schools in Zimbabwe
List of boarding schools

References

External links
Bernard Mizeki College

Marondera
Private schools in Zimbabwe
Anglican schools in Zimbabwe
High schools in Zimbabwe
Boys' schools in Zimbabwe
Boys' high schools in Zimbabwe
Buildings and structures in Mashonaland East Province
Education in Mashonaland East Province
Boarding schools in Zimbabwe
Educational institutions established in 1961
1961 establishments in Southern Rhodesia